Bohemian Rhapsody: The Original Soundtrack is the soundtrack album to the Queen biographical film of the same name. The soundtrack features many of the band's songs and unreleased recordings including tracks from their legendary concert at Live Aid in 1985. The soundtrack was released by Hollywood Records and Virgin EMI Records on 19 October 2018, on CD, cassette and digital formats. The soundtrack was later released on 8 February 2019, as a vinyl double album specially cut at Abbey Road Studios. A limited and much sought after double picture disc edition of the album, as well as a 7" coloured single featuring the original "Bohemian Rhapsody"/"I'm in Love with My Car" pairing, was also released on Record Store Day, 13 April 2019. The disc artwork takes its inspiration from the photography of Denis O'Regan. In November 2019, the soundtrack received an American Music Award for Top Soundtrack.

Background
The official soundtrack album, contains several Queen hits and 11 previously unreleased recordings, including five tracks from their 21-minute Live Aid performance in July 1985 previously unreleased in audio form. The set was issued on CD, cassette, and digital formats on 19 October 2018, and was later released on heavyweight vinyl on 8 February 2019. Hollywood Records released the album in the United States and Canada, while Virgin EMI Records handled the global release.

Commercial performance
Globally, the soundtrack held a top 10 position in twenty five album charts during 2018/19 (a total of 45 weeks in the UK top 10), becoming one of Queen's top selling albums in over 40 years. It became their second Australian number one album after A Night at the Opera in 1976. It initially debuted at number 22 on the US Billboard 200 with 24,000 album-equivalent units, which included 12,000 pure album sales. It served as Queen's seventeenth top 40 album in the United States. In its second week, the soundtrack climbed to number 3 on both the Billboard 200 and the official UK Albums Chart, while Queen's The Platinum Collection entered the top 10 of the Billboard 200 in the same week, making it the first time Queen have had two albums in the US top 10 at the same time. It peaked at number 2 on the Billboard 200 in its 18th week, becoming Queen's second-highest-charting album in the country. It was the 6th best-selling album in the 2019 UK end of year charts. The soundtrack has been certified platinum in several countries including the UK, Australia, and Japan.

Accolades
In November 2019, the Bohemian Rhapsody soundtrack won Favourite Soundtrack at the American Music Awards.

Track listing
Credits adapted from the liner notes.

Notes
  signifies a co-producer
  signifies an assistant producer
  signifies an additional producer
  signifies a mixing producer for movie mix only

Personnel
Main
John Deacon – bass guitar , guitars , piano , synthesizer 
Brian May – guitars, vocals , synthesizers , orchestral arrangements 
Freddie Mercury – piano, vocals , guitar , organ 
Roger Taylor – drums, vocals 

Additional
Tim Staffell – vocals, bass guitar 
David Bowie – vocals, synthesizer 
Spike Edney – keyboards, background vocals 
Michael Kamen – orchestral arrangements 
Fred Mandel – synthesizer 
National Philharmonic Orchestra – strings, brass and percussion

Charts

Weekly charts

Year-end charts

Decade-end charts

Certifications

References

2018 soundtrack albums
2010s film soundtrack albums
Virgin EMI Records albums
Queen (band) soundtracks
Hollywood Records soundtracks